Orbits is a public art work by Russian-American artist Alexander Liberman located at the Lynden Sculpture Garden near Milwaukee, Wisconsin. The sculpture is an abstract form; it is installed on the patio.

Description
The sculpture consists of four narrow tubes painted red-orange. Two tubes form elipses; two thrust toward the ground and out into space.

See also
Argo
Axeltree
Ritual II

References

Outdoor sculptures in Milwaukee
1967 sculptures
Steel sculptures in Wisconsin
Sculptures by Alexander Liberman
1967 establishments in Wisconsin
Abstract sculptures in Wisconsin